Michael Patrick Chamberlain Carns (born June 23, 1937) is a retired four-star general in the United States Air Force (USAF). He served as the Vice Chief of Staff of the United States Air Force from 1991 to 1994.

Early life
Carns was born in Junction City, Kansas. After graduating from St. John's College High School, Washington, D.C. in 1955, he went to the United States Air Force Academy and graduated with a Bachelor of Science degree in 1959.

After completing his B.S. degree, Carns completed primary pilot training in March 1960 at Graham Air Base in Florida and basic pilot training in September 1960 at Laredo Air Force Base in Texas.

Career
Following pilot training, Carns served as a flight instructor at Laredo. In 1961, he was appointed Aide to the Commander, Air Reserve Records Center, Denver, Colorado, then Aide to the Commander, 4th Air Force Reserve Region, Randolph Air Force Base, Texas, followed by duty as Air Operations Officer at the same base.

Carns completed an MBA degree from Harvard Business School in 1967. After getting his MBA, he was assigned to the 476th Tactical Fighter Squadron, George Air Force Base, flying F-4 Phantom II's. He transferred to the 40th Tactical Fighter Squadron, Eglin Air Force Base, again flying F-4s in January 1968. From August 1968 to September 1969 he was assigned to the 469th Tactical Fighter Squadron, Korat Royal Thai Air Force Base in Thailand, where he flew 200 combat missions in the F-4E during the Vietnam War.

Carns returned to the U.S. in September 1969 and he was assigned to USAF headquarters as a Plans and Programs Officer, and later, as Aide to the United States Air Force Chief of Staff. This was followed by tours at Torrejón Air Base in Spain, Supreme Headquarters Allied Powers Europe in Belgium and, RAF Bentwaters in England.

After completing the British Royal College of Defence Studies in 1977, Carns was assigned to the 81st Tactical Fighter Wing, RAF Bentwaters, as deputy commander for operations.

Carns returned to the U.S. again in March 1979 and took command of the 354th Tactical Fighter Wing, Myrtle Beach Air Force Base. He moved to Nellis Air Force Base in October 1980 as commander of the 57th Fighter Weapons Wing. In June 1982 he became director of operations, J-3, Rapid Deployment Joint Task Force, later redesignated United States Central Command, MacDill Air Force Base. He became deputy chief of staff for plans, Headquarters Pacific Air Forces, Hickam Air Force Base in July 1984, and deputy chief of staff for operations and intelligence in June 1985. In July 1986 he assumed command of 13th Air Force, Clark Air Base in the Philippines. In June 1987 he was assigned as deputy commander in chief and chief of staff, United States Pacific Command, Camp H.M. Smith in Hawaii. In September 1989 he became Director of the Joint Staff, Washington, DC. He became the Vice Chief of Staff of the United States Air Force in May 1991. On May 16, 1991, he was promoted to the rank of general.

Life after retirement from U.S. Air Force
Carns retired from the United States Air Force in July 1994. In 1995, Carns was nominated to head the Central Intelligence Agency. At first Carns accepted but later withdrew. Carns said he was presented with allegations that he had violated U.S. immigration law in providing for a Filipino citizen, Elbino Runas, to come to the United States, and that the Carns family had failed to honor an employment contract with Runas. Runas lived with the Carns family in the Philippines and the family obtained immigration documents to bring him with them to Hawaii. He subsequently moved with the Carns family to Washington, D.C. and stayed with the family until 1992.  Carns said he was presented with "groundless, outrageous, tabloid charges" made by Runas about members of Carns' family. 

Carns later served as the managing director of a small healthcare firm for one year, followed by over four years as executive director of a New York-based policy research firm that specialized in Pacific Rim security in the areas of international capital flows and international energy demands. He is currently the vice chairman of PrivaSource, Inc., a small software firm specializing in the security and de-identification of large, sensitive databases, in Weston, Massachusetts. Carns is also currently serves on the board of directors for VirtualAgility, Inc. and M-International, Inc.

Awards and decorations

See also
List of United States Air Force four-star generals

Notes

|-

1937 births
Harvard Business School alumni
Living people
Recipients of the Air Force Distinguished Service Medal
Recipients of the Air Medal
Recipients of the Defense Distinguished Service Medal
Recipients of the Defense Superior Service Medal
Recipients of the Distinguished Flying Cross (United States)
Recipients of the Legion of Merit
Recipients of the Outstanding Achievement Medal
Recipients of the Silver Star
United States Air Force Academy alumni
United States Air Force generals
Vice Chiefs of Staff of the United States Air Force